Marc Giuseppe Donato (born January 25, 1989) is a Canadian actor.

Career
One of the earliest films in which Donato appears is as eight-year-old Mike Hillary in the low budget television film, Specimen.

Later roles include Derek Haig on Degrassi: The Next Generation and those in Doc, Locked in Silence, The Blue Butterfly, Avatar: The Last Airbender and other cartoon voices, recently as Ethan in The Future Is Wild. He also had small roles as Mason in The Sweet Hereafter, Adam in Pay It Forward, Davey in White Oleander, and as a child in Adam Sandler's character's 1st grade class in Billy Madison, and starred in the thriller film The Final. His latest accomplishment was landing the role of Tarek in the live action feature film Bad Kids Go to Hell (2012), based on the best selling graphic novel of the same name. In 2013 he starred in Sick Boy starring with his real-life ex-girlfriend Skye McCole Bartusiak. He also had a role in the music video for Simple Plans hit song "I'd Do Anything" playing a boy who enters Simple Plan's concert with two dates.

References

External links

1989 births
20th-century Canadian male actors
21st-century Canadian male actors
Male actors from Toronto
Canadian male child actors
Canadian male film actors
Canadian male television actors
Canadian male voice actors
Canadian people of Italian descent
Living people